Saint-Pierre-de-Chignac is a railway station in Saint-Pierre-de-Chignac, Nouvelle-Aquitaine, France. The station is located on the Coutras–Tulle railway line. The station is served by TER (local) services operated by SNCF.

Train services
The station is served by regional trains towards Bordeaux, Périgueux and Brive-la-Gaillarde.

References

Railway stations in France opened in 1860
Railway stations in Dordogne